Anja Carolina Zijlstra (born 3 September 1973) is a Dutch darts player who competes in events of the World Darts Federation (WDF).

Career

World Championship results

BDO/WDF
 2016: Quarter-finals (lost to Aileen de Graaf 1–2)
 2017: First round (lost to Lorraine Winstanley 0–2)
 2018: First round (lost to Anastasia Dobromyslova 0–2)
 2022: Second round (lost to Priscilla Steenbergen 0–2)
 2023:

References

External links
 Anca Zijlstra on Darts Database

Living people
Dutch darts players
British Darts Organisation players
Sportspeople from Heerlen
1973 births
Professional Darts Corporation women's players